Steinman is an unincorporated community in Dickenson County, Virginia, in the United States.

History
A post office was established at Steinman in 1922, and remained in operation until it was discontinued in 1959. The community was named for the Steinman brothers, coal mining officials.

References

Unincorporated communities in Dickenson County, Virginia
Unincorporated communities in Virginia